This was the first edition of the tournament.

Thiago Seyboth Wild won the title after defeating Hugo Gaston 7–5, 6–1 in the final.

Seeds

Draw

Finals

Top half

Bottom half

References

External links
Main draw
Qualifying draw

Viña Challenger - 1